Valøya is a village in the municipality of Nærøysund in Trøndelag county, Norway. Valøy Chapel is located in this village.

References

Villages in Trøndelag
Nærøysund
Vikna